The 2019 Gardner–Webb Runnin' Bulldogs football team represented Gardner–Webb University in the 2019 NCAA Division I FCS football season. They were led by seventh-year head coach Carroll McCray and played their home games at Ernest W. Spangler Stadium. They were members of the Big South Conference. They finished the season 3–9, 1–5 in Big South play to finish in a three-way tie for fifth place. On November 24, 2019, Carroll McCray was fired, he finished with a record of 27–53.

Previous season
The Runnin' Bulldogs finished the 2018 season 3–8, 2–3 in Big South play to finish in fourth place.

Preseason

Big South poll
In the Big South preseason poll released on July 21, 2019, the Runnin' Bulldogs were predicted to finish in fifth place.

Preseason All–Big South team
The Runnin' Bulldogs had three players selected to the preseason all-Big South team.

Offense

Brandon Leahey – OL

Defense

John Singleton – DL

Darien Reynolds – LB

Schedule

Source:

Game summaries

at Charlotte

at East Carolina

North Carolina Central

at Wofford

at Western Carolina

Hampton

at Monmouth

Campbell

Charleston Southern

at Presbyterian

North Alabama

at Kennesaw State

References

Gardner-Webb
Gardner–Webb Runnin' Bulldogs football seasons
Gardner-Webb Runnin' Bulldogs f